Pentachloronitrobenzene, typically abbreviated PCNB, is a registered fungicide formally derived from nitrobenzene. It is either an off-white or yellow solid, depending on its purity, with a musty odor.

Preparation
PCNB was originally synthesized in the laboratory in 1868. It was introduced to the agricultural world in the 1930s in Germany by Bayer AG as a substitute to mercurial pesticides. PCNB is prepared by chlorination of nitrobenzene at 60–70 °C in chlorosulfuric acid, with iodine as a catalyst. It can also be produced by the nitration of chlorinated benzenes. A side product of the synthesis of PCNB is hexachlorobenzene (HCB), which is considered as hazardous as PCNB.

5 Cl2  +  C2H5NO2   →   C6Cl5NO2  +  5 HCl

Main reactions 
Reaction with ethanol and potassium hydroxide yields pentachlorophenetole, indicating its high reactivity:
C6Cl5NO2 + KOCH2CH3  →   C6Cl5OCH2CH3 +  KNO2

Although PCNB has a long shelflife, it is labile in soil, with a half life of 1.8 days. It degrades to other metabolites, mainly reducing to pentachloroaniline (PCA), but also to pentachlorophenol (PCP) through hydrolysis and pentachlorothioanisole (PCTA). Another metabolite is methyl pentachlorophenyl sulfide (MPCPS). Little information is available about the degradation mechanisms.

C6Cl5NO2  +  6 [H]   →   C6Cl5NH2  +  2 H2O
C6Cl5NO2  +  6 H2O   →   C6Cl5OH  +  HNO2

Applications 
PCNB is used as a fungicide to suppress the growth of fungi in various crops, such as cotton, rice, and seed grains. It is also used to prevent the formation of slime in industrial waters. Residual amounts of the compound and its metabolites can be found in crops. The degradation products, PCA and PCTA have been found in farming soils and in river sediments.

Regulation
In April 1993, PCNB was declared a  hazardous air pollutant in the U.S.  PCNB was reexamined for re-registration eligibility by the U.S. EPA in 2006 as part of the 1996 Food Protection Quality Act (FPQA) and as a result, use on a number of crops were ended or limited. In August 2010, in response to the discovery of a potentially toxic metabolite in technical grade PCNB to be used in fungicide formulations, the sale of PCNB was halted by the U.S. EPA until the issue could be resolved. In November 2011, the EPA approved certain registrations for PCNB, allowing it back on the market for golf course turf, potato, cotton, ornamental bulb and cole crop uses in the United States.  PCNB is used widely as a fungicide in other countries, such as China and Japan, however, "it is no longer approved for use within the European Union".

References

Bibliography
 Aschbacher PW, Feil VJ, Metabolism of pentachloronitrobenzene by goats and sheep; J Agric Food Chem. 1983 Nov-Dec; 31(6):1150-8.

Chloroarenes
Nitrobenzenes
Fungicides
Endocrine disruptors